Indian breads are a wide variety of flatbreads and crêpes which are an integral part of Indian cuisine. Their variation reflects the diversity of Indian culture and food habits.

Ingredients
Most flat breads from northern India are unleavened and made primarily from milled flour, usually atta or maida, and water. Some flatbreads, especially paratha, may be stuffed with vegetables and layered with either ghee or butter.

In Maharashtra and Karnataka, breads are also made from grains like jowar (Sorghum bicolor), ragi (Eleusine coracana) and bajra (pearl millet), and is called "rotla" in Gujarat and "bhakri" in Maharashtra.

In southern India and the West Coast, most pancakes are made from peeled and split black lentils (urad dal) and rice. Popular varieties include dosa, appam, and uttapam. Popular flatbreads include rice rotis and ragi rotis.

Most Indian breads make use of the yeast spores in the atmosphere for fermentation.

Preparation
In northern India, a dough of the main ingredient is prepared and flattened by rolling. Most Indian breads, such as roti, kulcha and chapati, are baked on tava, a griddle made from cast iron, steel or aluminum. Others such as puri and bhatura are deep-fried. The dough for these breads is usually made with less water in order to reduce the oil soaked up when frying.

In Southern India, a batter of rice and black lentils is prepared and ladled in small amounts onto a hot greased skillet, where it is spread out into a thin circle and fried with oil or ghee until golden brown.
In Western India (including the states of Maharashtra, Gujarat and Rajasthan) bread may be made from coarse grains such as bajra, sorghum or ragi, though wheat is the staple in these regions. The grains or cereals are usually milled into a fine powder, and mixed with a little water to make a smooth dough. This dough is patted into a circle by hand, either by holding it between the two hands or by placing it on an upturned plate or other flat surface.

In Maharashtra, a multi-grain flat-bread called "thalipeeth" is also prepared. It contains many grains and cereals like wheat, rice, bajra, jowar, ragi, horsegram, green gram, black gram, chickpeas and so on. Each grain or cereal is roasted separately and then milled together into a fine powder. Spices and chopped onions are added along with water to make the dough, and it is patted into circles, after which it is roasted on a griddle with some ghee or oil. It is often served with homemade butter.

Indian breads of Central Asian origin, such as naan and tandoori roti, are baked in a tandoor. Naan is usually leavened with yeast.

Varieties
Different varieties of Indian bread and pancake include Chapati, Phulka, Puri, Roti, Bajra Rotla, Thepla, Paratha, Naan, Kulcha, Bhatoora, Appam, Dosa, Luchi, Puran Poli, Pathiri, Parotta and many more. Some of these, like Paratha and Roti have many varieties. Some varieties depend on the kind of grain used to prepare them, and others depend on the fillings they contain.

 Dosa – a typical dish in South India. In Tamil Nadu the popular adai dishes are made from millet dough or rice dough. It is closer to a dosa when made with fermented batter of a mixture of lentils.
 Appam – type of South Indian pancake made with fermented rice batter and coconut milk
 Bobbatlu/Bakshalu/Obbattu – made of maida, chanadal/ toor dal, sugar/jaggery, from the Telugu / Kannada cuisine, specially prepared for the Ugadi (Lunar New Year) festival in Telugu states and Karnataka
 Baati – hard, unleavened bread cooked in the desert areas of Rajasthan, and in Madhya Pradesh
 Bafla - hard, ball boiled and then baked in Madhya Pradesh Malwa Region
 Bhakri – round flat unleavened bread made mainly using Sorgham bicolr or Pearl millet often used in the cuisine of the state of Maharashtra in India but is also common in western and central India, especially in the states of Rajasthan, Gujarat, Malwa, Goa, and northern Karnataka.
 Bhatoora – fluffy deep-fried leavened bread from North India
 Bhturu - Bhturu is famous in Himachali cuisine. It is prepared from soft kneaded fermented dough. It is almost like soft bread from inside and crisp outside. It is served with local delicacies of Himachli Dham like Madra, Dal and Khatta etc.
 Chapati – unleavened flatbread (also known as roti) from India, Nepal, Bangladesh and Pakistan which is baked on a hot surface. It is a common staple food in India
 Cheela – crepes made from batter of varying ingredients in North India - ingredients usually include pulse (dal) flour,Chickpea flour, wheat flour and sometimes finely chopped vegetables.
 Chikkolee – spicy wheat dish common in southern Andhra Pradesh and parts of Maharashtra.
Chhilka Roti - a bread from Jharkhand prepared using rice flour and chana daal.
 Charolia - a thin, pancake like bread made by spreading a batter on a hot pan in a pattern to make net like shape once cooked.
 Chili parotha – essentially a plain paratta shredded into small, bite-sized pieces mixed with sauteed onions, tomatoes, and chili powder
 Daal Puri – fried flatbread from West Bengal and odisha where the dough is filled with cooked & spiced Cholar Dal (Bengal Gram lentil). Popular as a breakfast food.
 Dhebra – Two different types: one made with pearl millet (bajra) flour, often flavoured with fenugreek leaf (methi). The other is an unleavened jaggery puri, made with jaggery and whole wheat flour.
 Dosa – fermented crêpe or pancake made from rice batter and black lentils. It is a staple dish in South Indian states of Karnataka, Tamil Nadu, Andhra Pradesh and Kerala.
 Masala dosa – dosa stuffed with fried potato, spices and onions
 Benne dose – type of dosa which traces its origin from the city of Davangere in Karnataka.
 Rava dosa – crêpe of South India.
 Neer dosa – crêpe prepared from rice batter. It is light type of dosa.
 Idli – rice and fermented black lentil batter that is steamed
 Rava idli - variation of idli made with semolina (rava)
 Kachori – unleavened deep-fried bread with lentils filling
 Khakhra – thin crackers made from mat bean, wheat flour and oil
 Kulcha – leavened bread eaten in India and Pakistan, made from maida flour (wheat flour)
 Luchi – deep-fried flatbread from Bengal similar to Puri but made with maida flour instead of atta.
 Naan – oven-baked leavened flatbread
 Keema naan – naan stuffed with minced meat
 Butter naan - naan topped with nigella seeds and greased with butter
 Papadum – thin, crisp disc-shaped Indian food typically based on a seasoned dough made from black gram (urad flour), fried or cooked with dry heat
 Paratha – layered or stuffed flatbread from North India - traditionally made from whole wheat flour by baking with oil on a hot surface.
 Aloo paratha
 Gobhi paratha
 Laccha paratha
 Porotta – layered flat bread of Kerala and some parts of Southern India
 Pashti – flatbread prepared with rice flour and pan fried in ghee
 Pathiri – pancake made of rice flour
 Pesaha Appam – unleavened Passover bread made by the Saint Thomas Christians (also known as Syrian Christians or Nasrani) of Kerala, India to be served on Passover night.
 Pesarattu – crepe-like bread that is similar to dosa, made out of mung dal with its origin in Andhra Pradesh.
 Minapa Rotte Pan Cakes made of Idli Batter with Origin in Andhra Pradesh
 Maggiga Rotte Dosa style sour flat bread made with dosa batter mixed with maida and Butter milk with Origin in Andhra Pradesh
 Dibbha Rotte Very thick Pan Cakes made of Idli Batter with Origin in Andhra Pradesh.
 Phulka
 Pitha/Pithe – type of cake made from fermented rice batter, dim sum or bread common in Bengal, Assam and Orissa.
 Chakuli pitha - Thin pancakes made of rice flour and black gram batter. It is similar to a dosa.
 Til Pitha – dry powdered rice cakes with Sesame seeds and Jaggery filling Assam
 bhapa pithe from Bengal
 Patishapta from Bengal
 Chitoi Pithe from Bengal
 Jhaal Pithe from Bangladesh; Pitha made from fermented rice batter mixed with sliced green chilli and coriander leaves
 Narikol Pitha dry powdered rice cakes with grated and sweetened coconut filling Assam
 Arisa Pitha - a traditional sweet deep fried pancake. The crispy outer layer surrounds soft insides.
 Manda Pitha – steamed Pitha Orissa
 Kakara Pitha – Orissa
 Poi/Poee – A Goan whole wheat hollow flatbread. 
 Poli/Puran Poli – traditional type of sweet flatbread
 Puri – unleavened deep-fried bread
 Pulla Attu Sour dosas made with mix of Dosa batter and Maida with Origins in Andhra Pradesh
 Radhaballabhi fried flatbread similar to Dalpuri but the filling consists of Urad Dal [Black Lentils] instead of Cholar Dal.
 Ragi dosa – dosa made out of finger millet.
 Roti – most simple and common of all Indian breads.
 Akki rotti
 Jolada rotti
 Makki di roti
 Ragi rotti– made of ragi (finger millet) flour
 Rumali Roti
 Rotlo (Bajra roti), a Gujarati staple bread made of millet flour
 Sanna – spongy rice cake available at Goa, made from fermented or unfermented Rice batter with or without sweeteners
 Sheermal – saffron-flavored flatbread from Kashmir
 Taftan – leavened bread from Uttar Pradesh
 Tandoori Roti – baked in a clay oven called a tandoor. Thicker than a normal Roti.
 Thalipeeth – savoury multi-grain pancake popular in Maharashtra.
 Utthapam – dosa-like dish made by cooking ingredients in a batter
 Kori Rotti – crisp dry wafers (about 1mm thick) made from boiled rice and served along with spicy Chicken curry. Usually available in A4 size packs and very popular bread in Coastal Karnataka.
 Litti - Litti, along with chokha, is a complete meal originated from the Indian subcontinent; and popular in Indian states of Bihar, Jharkhand, parts of Uttar Pradesh as well as Nepalese state of Madhesh. It is a dough ball made up of whole wheat flour and stuffed with Sattu (roasted chickpea flour) mixed with herbs and spices and then roasted over coal or cow dung cakes or wood then it is tossed with much ghee. Although very often confused with the closely related Baati, it is a completely different dish in terms of taste, texture and preparation. It may be eaten with yogurt, baigan bharta, alu bharta, and papad.
 Thepla - Gujarati chapatti made with whole wheat flour and flavoured with fenugreek leaves and spices.

Gallery

See also

 List of breads
List of Indian dishes
Culture of India
Indian cuisine

References